Hector H. Perry was a politician in North Dakota.

Biography
Perry was born on August 20, 1876, in New London, Wisconsin to Ebenezer P. and Caroline J. Perry. He would go on to work in real estate and become a lawyer. In 1900, he married Jennie H. Monty.

Political career
Perry was twice Chairman of the North Dakota Democratic Party. First, from 1914 to 1926, and second, from 1928 to 1931. He had also been a member of the North Dakota Democratic Committee twice. First, from 1912 to 1916, and second, from 1928 to 1936. Perry was a member of the Democratic National Committee from 1926 to 1924 and in 1932. In 1920, he was a candidate for the United States Senate, losing to Edwin F. Ladd. Later, he was U.S. Collector of Internal Revenue of North Dakota from 1933 to 1947.

References

People from New London, Wisconsin
North Dakota Democrats
North Dakota lawyers
1876 births
Year of death missing
People from Dickey County, North Dakota